Sătmăreanu is a Romanian surname. Notable people with the surname include:

Alexandru Sătmăreanu (born 1952), Romanian footballer
Lajos Sătmăreanu (born 1944), Romanian footballer of Hungarian descent

Romanian-language surnames